The Lisbon Oceanarium is an oceanarium in Lisbon, Portugal. It is located in the Parque das Nações, which was the exhibition grounds for the Expo '98. It is one of the largest indoor aquariums in Europe.

Architecture 

The Lisbon Oceanarium’s conceptual design, architecture, and exhibit design was led by Peter Chermayeff of Peter Chermayeff LLC while at Cambridge Seven Associates. It is said to resemble an aircraft carrier, and is built on a pier in an artificial lagoon. Chermayeff is also the designer of the Osaka Oceanarium Kaiyukan, one of the world's largest aquariums, and many other aquariums around the world.

Exhibits 

The Lisbon Oceanarium has a large collection of marine species — penguins, seagulls and other birds; sea otters (mammals); sharks, rays, chimaeras, seahorses and other bony fish; crustaceans; starfish, sea urchins and other echinoderms; sea anemones, corals and other cnidaria; octopuses, cuttlefish, sea snails and other mollusks; amphibians; jellyfish; marine plants and terrestrial plants and other marine organisms totaling about 16,000 individuals of 450 species.

About 100 species from around the world are kept in this tank, including sharks, rays, barracudas, groupers, and moray eels. One of the main attractions is a large sunfish.

Four tanks around the large central tank house four different habitats with their native flora and fauna: the North Atlantic rocky coast, the Antarctic coastal line, the Temperate Pacific kelp forests, and the Tropical Indian coral reefs. These tanks are separated from the central tank only by large sheets of acrylic to provide the illusion of a single large tank. Throughout the first floor there are an additional 25 thematic aquariums with each of the habitats' own characteristics.

The Lisbon Oceanarium is one of the few aquariums in the world to house a sunfish, because of their unique and demanding requirements for care. Other species include two large spider crabs and two sea otters named Eusébio after the soccer player and Amália, named after the fado singer Amália Rodrigues. After both otters died (Eusébio in 2020 and Amália in 2013), two new otters (named Micas and Maré), their daughters, which had been loaned to the Rotterdam zoo were brought back.

In 2015, a temporary exhibition, “Forests Underwater" by Takashi Amano opened. It is a tropical freshwater aquarium featuring a large amount of plants and is the world's largest nature aquarium at 40 metres long and 160,000 litres. Originally scheduled to be open 2 years, it remains open today.

Notes

External links

 
 
 Photos from Ocenarium

Aquaria in Portugal
Oceanarium
Oceanaria
Modernist architecture in Portugal
Tourist attractions in Lisbon
Parque das Nações
Zoos established in 1998
1998 establishments in Portugal